Sunny Thomas is a former Indian national shooting champion in the rifle open sight event from Kerala, India. He was the coach of Indian shooting team for 19 years from 1993 to 2012. India won 108 gold, 74 silver and 53 bronze medals from various tournaments including the World Championships, Olympics and the Asian Games during his stint. He received the Dronacharya Award in 2001.

On his 80th birthday, Abhinav Bindra expressed gratitude with the following words shared through a video message “I want to thank you for the guidance and support you provided me throughout my sporting career. As a patient and understanding mentor, you kept us going, through the tough times. Thank you for being a pillar of strength and nurturing me to unfurl my fullest potential"

Background 
He was a Professor of English language in St. Stephen's College, Uzhavoor, Kottayam district and became a full-time shooting coach after his retirement. He is married to Josamma Sunny, a Professor of Botany from the same college where he had worked.

References

Living people
Sport shooters from Kerala
Indian male sport shooters
Recipients of the Dronacharya Award
Malayali people
1941 births